Jean-Pierre Papon (23 January 1734 – 15 January 1803) was an 18th-century French abbot, historian of the Provence and of the French Revolution.

Life and work 
Papon finished school in Turin and at the age of 18 years became an Oratorian. He then taught as a secondary school teacher in Marseille, Riom, Nantes and Lyon. From 1780, he was a librarian in Marseille and a member of the Académie de Marseille. He fled the French revolution into the Cevennes and on 24 February 1796 became a non resident member of the newly (1795) founded Institut de France (Académie des sciences morales et politique). He was also one of the resident members of the Société des observateurs de l'homme.

He was one of the authors who prepared the scientific Romance and Provencal linguistics of the 19th century.

Works 
1765: L’art du poète et de l‘orateur. Ouvrage destiné à diriger les études, et à former le goût des jeunes gens et des personnes qui s'adonnent à la littérature. Preceded by an Essai sur l'Éducation, Lyon 1765, 1766, 1768, 1774, 1783; Paris 1800, 1806; Avignon 1811
 1777–1786: Histoire générale de Provence - 4 vol. Moutard; Read online. In the second volume he incorporated long passages about the troubadours and the history of the Provencal language.
 1780: Histoire littéraire de Provence - Barois l'aîné Read online  
 1788: Histoire du Gouvernement Français, depuis l'Assemblée des Notables, tenue le 22 février 1787, jusqu'à la fin de Décembre de la même année, London 1788, Paris 1789
 1800: De la peste ou Epoques mémorables de ce fléau et des moyens de s'en préserver - Lavillette et compagnie - Paris
 1815: Histoire de la Révolution de France, 6 vol. (posthumous work)

Sources 
Pierre Larousse, Dictionnaire universel du XIXe siècle.

External links 

 Biography 
 Papon, Jean-Pierre
 Œuvres de l'abbé Jean-Pierre PAPON

18th-century French historians
French librarians
Linguists from France
People from Provence
1734 births
1803 deaths